The Waatch River is a stream on the Olympic Peninsula in the U.S. state of Washington. It originates in the northwestern Olympic Mountains and empties into the Pacific Ocean through Makah Bay. The name "Waatch" comes from the Makah village name /waʔač'/, said to mean "bundling up cedar to make a torch".

Course
The Waatch River originates in the northwestern portion of Olympic Peninsula in the Makah Reservation. It flows north for several miles to within a mile of Neah Bay. After collecting the tributary Educket Creek the Waatch River turns west. It empties into the Pacific Ocean at northern end of Makah Bay, south of Waatch Point and Cape Flattery, and about a mile north of the mouth of the Sooes River. The Makah Air Force Station is located at the river's mouth.

See also
 List of rivers of Washington

References

Rivers of Washington (state)
Rivers of Clallam County, Washington